Saju Paul is a leftist Indian politician, former Member of Kerala Legislative Assembly from Perumbavoor constituency, Kerala, India.

Early life
He was born to P.I. Paulose, Ex. M.L.A. and Kunjamma on 8 May 1966 at Pandappilly.

Career
He started his political career with Young Men Association, Public Library and Arts Society of Vengoor in 1983. Worked for Kerala Sasthra Sahithya Parishad, Ernakulam District Total Literacy Mission, Kuvappady Block Literacy Mission and Kalajatha Team of National Literacy Mission. He served as Member, President and Secretary of D.Y.F.I. Block committee, Member, Local and Area Committee Member, of C.P.I.(M), Secretary of C.P.I.(M), Vengoor Local Committee, Member, President and Secretary of D.Y.F.I. Block Committee and District Committee Member of D.Y.F.I. District Committee.

References

External links

Members of the Kerala Legislative Assembly
Malayali politicians
Living people
1966 births
Communist Party of India (Marxist) politicians from Kerala
People from Ernakulam district
20th-century Indian politicians